Rainer Maria Schießler (born 7 October 1960 in Munich) is a German Roman Catholic priest. Due his unconventional style of pastoral ministry and his presence in the media he is said to be one of the most famous men of the church in Bavaria.

Life 
Schießler grew up in the district of the parish "Zu den heiligen zwölf Aposteln" in Munich-Laim. In 1980 he graduated from high school at the Wittelsbacher-Gymnasium München receiving the Bavarian school diploma "Abitur". From 1981 to 1986 he was studying theology at the University of Munich and the University of Salzburg. In 1986/1987 he spent a pastoral year in the pastoral unit Bad Kohlgrub. He was ordained to the priesthood on the 27 June 1987 in Freising. From 1987 to 1991 he was chaplain of the church "St. Nikolaus" in Rosenheim. From 1991 to 1993 he was chaplain in church "Heiligkreuz" in Munich-Giesing. Since 1993 he leads as parson the St. Maximilian parish in München (he was officially installed in 1995).

From 2006 to 2012 Schießler worked every year in the Schottenhamel-Tent at the Octoberfest in Munich as a waiter. He donated his salary from this job to a charity. After a break of two years he worked in 2015 another time at the Octoberfest and donated his earnings to a charity project for Syria initiated by the Bavarian comedian Christian Springer.

Since 2011 he is administering  besides St. Maximilian parish also the Heilig-Geist parish at the Viktualienmarkt.

Since December 2012 he has had his own Talkshow called Pfarrer Schießler, which is produced and broadcast by Bayerischer Rundfunk.

He often receives public attention for his progressive and often provocative statements for a vital and active church.

Books 
 Himmel, Herrgott, Sakrament. Auftreten statt austreten. 2. Auflage. Kösel, München 2016, .

Quotes 
 „I got to know God better in some bars than in many bible study meetings.“ (translated from German)

See also

References

External links 
 https://www.ovb-online.de/politik/himmel-herrgott-sakrament-6217735.html
 http://www.abendzeitung-muenchen.de/inhalt.pfarrer-rainer-schiessler-im-az-gespraech-was-hat-der-liebe-gott-davon-dass-ich-allein-bin.ea8d97b9-e315-4e63-9a9c-2230d0d02a33.html
 http://www.tz.de/muenchen/stadt/pfarrer-rainer-maria-schiessler-ueber-sex-zoelibat-verhuetung-wandel-neues-buch-6210796.html
 Homepage von Schießler bei der Pfarrgemeinde St. Maximilian (München)
 http://www.merkur-online.de/lokales/muenchen/stadt-muenchen/rekordjahr-wiesn-pfarrer-486402.html
 http://www.merkur-online.de/lokales/muenchen/stadt-muenchen/fahrzeugsegnung-pfarrer-rainer-schiessler-fotostrecke-422787.html
 http://www.emf-muenchen.de/Predigt2012-Bistro1.pdf
 http://www.focus.de/panorama/reportage/tid-17777/reportage-gratwanderer-gottes_aid_487253.html

1960 births
20th-century German Roman Catholic priests
21st-century German Roman Catholic priests
Living people
Clergy from Munich